Evelyn Yesenia García Marroquín (born December 29, 1982) is a Salvadoran cycle racer, who specialises as an all-rounder, having won time-trials and mountain stages in the past. She has won the Vuelta a El Salvador on two occasions, the only woman to do so, in 2004 and 2007.

Born in Santa Ana, García competed in the Summer Olympic Games in 2004 and 2008, both times in the road race and the track individual pursuit. She also competed at the 2012 Summer Olympics in the road race, finishing 26th.

Major results

2002
 Central American and Caribbean Games
3rd  Individual pursuit
3rd  Scratch
3rd  Time trial
2003
 UCI B World Championships
2nd  Individual pursuit
2nd  Time trial
2004
 1st Overall Vuelta a El Salvador
1st Prologue, Stages 1, 2 & 3
2005
 2nd Overall Vuelta a El Salvador
2006
 National Road Championships
1st Road race
1st Time trial
 7th Overall Vuelta a El Salvador
1st Stage 5
2007
 UCI B World Championships
1st  Individual pursuit
2nd  Points race
 National Road Championships
1st Road race
1st Time trial
 1st Overall Vuelta a El Salvador
1st Stages 3 (ITT), 4, & 5
 2nd GP Raiffeisen
 Pan American Road Championships
7th Time trial
8th Road race
2008
 1st Reyrieux
 5th Time trial, Pan American Road Championships
 9th Overall Vuelta a El Salvador
2009
 National Road Championships
1st Road race
1st Time trial
 1st Overall Vuelta Internacional Femenina a Costa Rica
1st Stages 1, 2 & 5
 1st Overall Vuelta Femenina a Guatemala
1st Stages 1 & 3
2010
 Central American Games
1st  Road race
3rd  Time trial
 National Road Championships
1st Road race
1st Time trial
 1st Overall Vuelta Internacional Femenina a Costa Rica
 1st Campeonato de Copa III El Salvador
 2nd  Time trial, Central American and Caribbean Games
2011
 National Road Championships
1st Road race
1st Time trial
 2nd  Time trial, Pan American Games
 Pan American Road Championships
2nd  Road race
7th Time trial
2012
 1st Grand Prix GSB
 3rd Overall Vuelta a El Salvador
 5th Grand Prix el Salvador
2013
 1st  Time trial, Central American Games
 4th Overall Vuelta Internacional Femenina a Costa Rica
1st Stage 1
 4th Grand Prix de Oriente
 6th Overall Vuelta a El Salvador
 10th Time trial, Pan American Road Championships
2014
 5th Time trial, Central American and Caribbean Games
2015
 National Road Championships
1st Road race
1st Time trial
 3rd  Time trial, Pan American Games
 6th Overall Vuelta Internacional Femenina a Costa Rica
2016
 Pan American Road Championships
4th Time trial
8th Road race
2017
 National Road Championships
1st Road race
1st Time trial

References

External links

1982 births
Living people
Salvadoran female cyclists
Olympic cyclists of El Salvador
Cyclists at the 2003 Pan American Games
Cyclists at the 2004 Summer Olympics
Cyclists at the 2008 Summer Olympics
Cyclists at the 2011 Pan American Games
Sportspeople from Santa Ana, El Salvador
Cyclists at the 2012 Summer Olympics
Pan American Games silver medalists for El Salvador
Pan American Games bronze medalists for El Salvador
Cyclists at the 2015 Pan American Games
Pan American Games medalists in cycling
Central American and Caribbean Games silver medalists for El Salvador
Central American and Caribbean Games bronze medalists for El Salvador
Competitors at the 2002 Central American and Caribbean Games
Central American and Caribbean Games medalists in cycling
Medalists at the 2011 Pan American Games
Medalists at the 2015 Pan American Games
Competitors at the 2010 Central American and Caribbean Games